The Leman gas field is a natural gas field located in the North Sea.The field is  north-east of Great Yarmouth and is named after the Leman Sandbank beneath which it is situated. It was discovered in August 1966 and extends across two blocks. Block 49/26 is licensed to Shell and Block 49/27 was originally licensed to the Amoco-Gas Council joint venture, Block 49/27 is now licensed to Perenco UK Ltd. The field was discovered in 1966 and began production in 1968 and produces natural gas and condensates to the Bacton Gas Terminal on the coast of Norfolk via several pipeline systems. The total proven reserves of the Leman gas field are around 11 trillion cubic feet (316 km³), and production is slated to be around 200 million cubic feet/day (5.7×105m³).

Development 
The Shell Leman 49/26A (AD1, AD2, AP & AK) installation began production in August 1968. It had initial recoverable reserves of 292 billion m3. It is connected to the Shell terminal at Bacton. Leman 49/26B (BT & BH) and 49/26B (BP & BD) began production in November 1970. Leman 49/26C (CD & CP) began in February 1972. Leman 49/26D began in August 1974. Leman 49/26E started in August 1983. Leman 49/26F and 49/26G began in September 1987. The Leman complex of platforms are connected to Bacton via Leman 49/26A, which is east of the Hewett complex. A decommissioned 36-inch pipeline formerly delivered gas from Leman 49/26BT to Bacton. Gas and condensate is piped to Bacton via Leman 49/26A Complex (AK, AP, AD1 and AD2).

The installations developed by Shell were:

The Shell Leman 49/26A complex also receives gas from the Corvette CV installation (Block 49/24) via a 36.6 km, 20-inch pipeline.

Block 49/27 of the Leman field is licensed to, and operated by, Perenco UK Ltd, originally by the Gas Council-Amoco. BP took over the interests of Amoco in 1998 and operated as BP-Amoco, subsequently BP. Perenco UK Ltd took over the interests of BP in the Leman and Indefatigable fields and BP plant at Bacton in 2003. The field had initial recoverable reserves of 292 billion m3. It comprises the following installations, platforms and complexes: Leman 49/27A (AD, AP, AC, AQ, AX); 49/27B (BD, BP, BT); 49/27C (CD, CP); 49/27D (DD, DP); 49/27E (ED, EP); 49/27F (FD, FP); 49/27G; 49/27H; and 49/27J. Gas is routed to Bacton via two 30-inch pipelines from Leman 49/27A and Leman 49/27B.

The Leman installations developed by Amoco, now owned by Perenco, were:

The Perenco Leman 49/27A complex also receives gas from the Camelot CA installation (Block 53/1a) via a 14.5 km, 12-inch pipeline.

In the mid-1990s the glycol dehydration facilities of several installations in the Inde and Leman fields was decommissioned. This enabled the installations to become normally unattended installations (NUIs) reducing manning costs and the risks to personnel.

Production 
The Leman gas composition and properties are as follows.

The annual gas production from the Shell Leman field (in million standard cubic feet) was:The annual gas production from the Amoco Leman field (in million standard cubic feet) was:

See also 

 Indefatigable gas field
Hewett gas field
West Sole gas field
Viking gas field
Arthurian gas fields
Brigantine, Caravel, Corvette and Shamrock gas fields

References

Natural gas fields in the United Kingdom
North Sea energy